Cryptocarya gregsonii, commonly known as native blackbutt, black plum or laurel, is a flowering plant in the laurel family. The specific epithet honours Jesse Gregson of Newcastle, New South Wales, a botanical friend of Maiden.

Description
It is a small tree, growing to 12 m in height. The thick, ovate to suborbicular leaves are 3–8 cm long. The flowers are green, 5 mm in diameter, borne in inflorescences in the axils of the upper leaves of the shoots. The fruits are 4–6 cm long, 3.5 cm wide and 2.5 cm thick, black and fleshy when ripe. The flowering season is from November to early February.

Distribution and habitat
The plant is endemic to Australia’s subtropical Lord Howe Island in the Tasman Sea. It is generally uncommon, though locally abundant in the southern mountains of the Island, from an elevation of 300 m up to the summit of Mount Gower at 875 m.

References

gregsonii
Endemic flora of Lord Howe Island
Laurales of Australia
Plants described in 1902
Taxa named by Joseph Maiden